Tokai Teio (Japanese: トウカイテイオー, April 20, 1988 – August 30, 2013) was a champion Japanese thoroughbred racehorse. In 1991 he won the Satsuki Sho and the Tokyo Yushun. He was the 1991 Japanese Horse of the Year. In 1992 he won the Japan Cup where champion horses like the European Horse of the Year and the Australian Champion Racehorse of the Year participated. In 1993, after he has just rested his broken leg injury for a whole year (364 days), he won the Arima Kinen. Tokai Teio was inducted into the Japan Racing Association Hall of Fame in 1995.

Background
Tokai Teio was sired by triple crown winner Symboli Rudolf. Tokai Teio's dam was Tokai Natural, the half sister of Yushun Himba winner Tokai Roman. Because Natural had foot problems, she could not debut and became a brood mare. Natural and Roman's owner Masanori Uchimura had obtained the breeding right to Symboli Rudolf and originally planned to breed him with Roman. However, Roman, who was supposed to retire after the Niigata Daishoten, placed second, and it was decided that she would race for one more year. Natural was bred with Rudolf instead.

Tokai Natural gave birth on April 20, 1988, at the Nagahama Ranch in Niikappu, Hokkaido. Immediately after birth, the foal was referred to as「帝王」"Teio", meaning monarch, referring to his sire Symboli Rudolf's nickname「皇帝」"Koutei", meaning emperor. Thus, the foal was named Hamano Teio. Teio had long legs and a delicate frame and did not receive high valuations. However, once he started exercising, his flexible movement became apparent, garnering expectations. In October the following year, Teio was transferred to the Nibutani Training Center in Biratori, Hokkaido where his flexibility and competitive spirit was highly received. Teio would remain at Nibutani for an entire year until reaching the racing age of 3 years in October, 1990, after which he entered the Rittō Training Center in Rittō, Shiga under trainer Shoichi Matsumoto. Teio's racing name was registered as Tokai Teio.

During training, Tokai Teio was outstanding on the ramp course where horses with long strides are not supposed to record good times, giving Matsumoto high expectations. Believing Teio to have a chance in the Japanese Triple Crown, Matsumoto back-calculated from the Satsuki Shō and Tokyo Yūshun and planned a schedule with leeway. Furthermore, Teio's farrier was surprised at the flexibility of his joints, saying to his groom that "the derby horse has arrived".

Racing career 

 Major Racing Wins
 1991 Satsuki Sho (Japanese 2000 Guineas) (Domestic GI), Nakayama Turf 2000m
 1991 Tokyo Yushun (Japanese Derby) (Domestic GI), Tokyo Turf 2400m
 1992 Osaka Hai (Domestic GII), Hanshin Turf 2000m
 1992 Japan Cup (GI), Tokyo Turf 2400m
 1993 Arima Kinen (Grand Prix) (Domestic GI), Nakayama Turf 2500m

Honours
 1991 Japanese Horse of the Year
 1991 JRA Award for Best Three-Year-Old Colt
 1991 JRA Award for Best Horse By Home-bred Sire
 1993 JRA Special Award

Tokai Teio was inducted into the Japan Racing Association Hall of Fame in 1995.

Stud career
Tokai Teio's descendants include:

c = colt, f = filly, g= gelding

Popular culture 
Tokai Teio was the inspiration for the main character of the 2021 anime Uma Musume Pretty Derby Season 2.

Pedigree

See also
 List of historical horses

Notes

Citations

References

  ISBN 4908655073
  ISBN 4839912270

1988 racehorse births
2013 racehorse deaths
Thoroughbred family 19-b
Racehorses bred in Japan
Racehorses trained in Japan
Japan Cup winners
Japanese Thoroughbred Horse of the Year
Byerley Turk sire line